Samuele is the Italian spelling of Samuel.

Samuele may also refer to:
 Asteroid 11622 Samuele, named after Italian amateur astronomer Samuele Marconi
 Samuele (Mayr), oratorio

Italian masculine given names